"Baa, Baa, Black Sheep" is an English nursery rhyme, the earliest printed version of which dates from around 1744. The words have not changed very much in two and a half centuries. It is sung to a variant of the 18th century French melody Ah! vous dirai-je, maman.

Modern version

Modern versions tend to take the following form:

The rhyme is a single stanza in trochaic metre, which is common in nursery rhymes and relatively easy for younger children. The Roud Folk Song Index, which catalogues folk songs and their variations by number, classifies the song as 4439 and variations have been collected across Great Britain and North America.

Melody

The rhyme is usually sung to a variant of the 18th century French melody Ah! vous dirai-je, maman, which is also used for "Twinkle Twinkle Little Star", "Little Polly Flinders", and "Alphabet song". The words and melody were first published together by A. H. Rosewig in (Illustrated National) Nursery Songs and Games, published in Philadelphia in 1879.

The text was translated to Swedish by August Strindberg for Barnen i skogen (1872), a Swedish edition of Babes in the Wood. To this Swedish text a melody was written by Alice Tegnér and published in the songbook Sjung med oss, Mamma! (1892), where the black sheep is now a white lamb: Bä, bä, vita lamm, one of the most popular Swedish children's songs.

Origins and meaning

As with many nursery rhymes, attempts have been made to find origins and meanings for the rhyme, most of which have no corroborating evidence. Katherine Elwes Thomas in The Real Personages of Mother Goose (1930) suggested the rhyme referred to resentment at the heavy taxation on wool. This has particularly been taken to refer to the medieval English "Great" or "Old Custom" wool tax of 1275, which survived until the fifteenth century  More recently the rhyme has been alleged to have a connection to the slave trade, particularly in the southern United States. This explanation was advanced during debates over political correctness and the use and reform of nursery rhymes in the 1980s, but has no supporting historical evidence. Rather than being negative, the wool of black sheep may have been prized as it could be made into dark cloth without dyeing.

The rhyme was first printed in Tommy Thumb's Pretty Song Book, the oldest surviving collection of English language nursery rhymes, published c. 1744 with the  lyrics very similar to the contemporary version:

In the next surviving printing, in Mother Goose's Melody (c. 1765), the rhyme remained the same, except the last lines, which were given as, "But none for the little boy Who cries in the lane".

Modern controversies

A controversy emerged over changing the language of "Baa Baa Black Sheep" in Britain from 1986, because, it was alleged in the popular press, it was seen as racially dubious. This was based only on a rewriting of the rhyme in one private nursery as an exercise for the children there and not on any local government policy. A similar controversy emerged in 1999 when reservations about the rhyme were submitted to Birmingham City Council by a working group on racism in children's resources, which were never approved or implemented. Two private nurseries in Oxfordshire in 2006 altered the song to "Baa Baa Rainbow Sheep", with black being replaced with a variety of other adjectives, like "happy, sad, hopping" and "pink". Commentators have asserted that these controversies have been exaggerated or distorted by some elements of the press as part of a more general campaign against political correctness.

In 2014, there was reportedly a similar controversy in the Australian state of Victoria.

Allusions
The phrase "yes sir, yes sir, three bags full sir" has been used to describe any obsequious or craven subordinate. It is attested from 1910, and originally was common in the British Royal Navy.

The rhyme has often been raised in literature and popular culture. Rudyard Kipling used the rhyme as the title of a semi-autobiographical short story he wrote in 1888. The name Black Sheep Squadron was used for the Marine Attack Squadron 214 of the United States Marine Corps from 1942 and the title Baa Baa Black Sheep was used for a book by its leader Colonel Gregory "Pappy" Boyington and for a TV series (later syndicated as Black Sheep Squadron) that aired on NBC from 1976 until 1978. In 1951, together with "In the Mood", "Baa Baa Black Sheep" was the first song ever to be digitally saved and played on a computer.

See also

 List of nursery rhymes

Notes

Fictional sheep
1744 songs
Songs about sheep
English nursery rhymes
Songwriter unknown
English folk songs
English children's songs
Traditional children's songs